Edward Sexton (born 9 November 1942) is a British Savile Row tailor, fashion designer and manufacturing consultant. Sexton has been called a key player in the history of Savile Row.

Early life

Edward Sexton went to English Martyrs School (in Southwark) from 1953 to 1957. Leaving school, Sexton went to work at Lew Rose (in 1957), a suit manufacturing factory in East London, where he received his initial training.  Lew Rose operated a section production system; Sexton progressed around each section developing basic tailoring skills.

In 1959, Sexton went to work as an apprentice for Jerry Vanderstine, a coat maker who worked for Harry Hall (specialist equestrian tailor on Regent Street, London). In 1959, John Oates, the head cutter at Harry Hall, then asked Sexton to come and work as an assistant cutter and trimmer.

In 1961, Sexton worked at Cyril A. Castle, a celebrity tailor, as an assistant jacket-cutter and trouser-cutter. While working at Cyril A. Castle, Sexton got his first position of responsibility on the cutting board and put himself through a pattern cutting course at Burner Street Technical College (later to become part of the London College of Fashion).

In 1962, Sexton moved to Kilgour French and Stanbury, where he finished his training.

In 1966, Sexton got his first job as a fully-fledged cutter at (military tailor) Welsh and Jefferies, where he honed his skills cutting both military and civilian tailoring. Sexton made trips to Royal Military Academy Sandhurst to make uniforms for officers passing. Sexton believed this experience proved invaluable to the work he would later produce.

Nutters of Savile Row
In 1967, Sexton went to work as a cutter for Donaldson, Williams and Ward, where he met the young salesman Tommy Nutter. Nutter quickly recognised Sexton's talent and they started working together for private clients. Through this work they began to develop a style (a waisted and flared jacket with wide lapels and parallel trousers) which was to evolve over the years. Nutter was very handsome and always impeccably dressed, and quickly drew clients from his social circle, which was growing in size and influence.

On 14 February 1969, Edward Sexton and Tommy Nutter opened Nutters of Savile Row at No. 35a Savile Row, with the backing of Cilla Black, Bobby Willis, James Vallance White and Peter Brown. This was the first new Savile Row establishment in 120 years. 
Nutter was the creative force and front of house focus, while Sexton was a traditional bespoke master cutter who created the garments. It has been said that "Sexton was the genius behind Nutters."

In 1976, Tommy left Nutters of Savile Row and Sexton became managing director.

Sexton remained managing director until 1982, when he moved from 35a to 36–37 Savile Row and changed the name of the business to Edward Sexton.

Leaving Savile Row

In 1990, Sexton left Savile Row to set up in Knightsbridge, alongside couturiers Caroline Charles  and Bruce Oldfield . Sexton continues to operate, by appointment only, from a studio on Beauchamp Place, producing bespoke tailoring for both men and women. Bespoke shirts and an exclusive selection of accessories for his customers offer a complete Sexton 'look'.

Consultancy and collaborations

Wilkes Bashford 
From 1987, Sexton produced a collaborative range for Wilkes Bashford in San Francisco.

Poor Little Rich Girl 
Sexton made the costumes for the $12million NBC production of Poor Little Rich Girl: The Barbara Hutton Story. Sexton dressed many of the characters in the film, including James Read as Cary Grant, Anthony Peck, and Farrah Fawcett.

Saks Fifth Avenue ready to wear 
In September 1988, Sexton created an exclusive line for Saks Fifth Avenue of made to measure suits and ready to wear tailoring: shirts, ties, socks, canes, hats, pocket squares and ascots.

Stella McCartney and Chloé 
In 1995, while studying at Central St. Martins, Stella McCartney served an apprenticeship with Sexton, who was her father's tailor. Sexton helped McCartney develop her graduate show that was modelled by Kate Moss, Naomi Campbell and Yasmin Le Bon.  The show made front-page news, and the entire collection was sold to Tokio, a London boutique.

In 1997, when McCartney took over from Karl Lagerfeld at Chloé, as creative director she "relied on" Sexton to create her first Paris collection. Sexton worked for Chloé as a consultant and continued tutoring McCartney in cutting, design, fabric selection and tailoring. In 1999, Sexton refused to renew his contract with Chloé.

Petra Ecclestone Form Clothing 
In 2007, Bernie Ecclestone showed Sexton designs by his 18-year-old daughter Petra. Sexton was impressed, and he started working with Petra to develop her label, Form, though the company closed the following year.

Famous outfits

In the interests of their privacy, Sexton does not like to discuss his clients. Notable clients include:

| Adam Lambert  || || Velvet Album suits  
|}

References

External links

Living people
Shops in London
Clothing retailers of the United Kingdom
1942 births
British tailors